The Trentino-Alto Adige/Südtirol provincial elections of 2018 took place on 21 October 2018.

Trentino 

In Trentino, the president is elected directly by the people; the candidate who gains the most votes is elected president.

Parties and candidates

Results

Analysis
Similar to the election in Molise and the election in Friuli-Venezia Giulia, the M5S lost c. 15% of votes compared to the general election. On March 4, they reached almost 25%, but now just over 7%. By contrast, the centre-right coalition gained more than 10% compared to March 4.

South Tyrol 

In South Tyrol, all 35 members of the Provincial council (Landtag) are up for re-election. The council elects a government headed by a president (Landeshauptmann).

In the 2013 election, the South Tyrolean People's Party (SVP) lost its absolute majority for the first time since 1948.

Results

References 

Elections in Trentino-Alto Adige/Südtirol
2018 elections in Italy
October 2018 events in Italy